Steven Deana (born 4 March 1990) is a Swiss professional footballer who plays as a goalkeeper for Servette FC.

Career
Deana began his career with FC Wetzikon and joined FC Effretikon in summer 2003. After only one season with Effretikon, he was scouted from FC Winterthur in June 2005. Shortly after, he left Winterthur to sign a youth contract with Grasshopper Club Zürich.

On 21 June 2009, he left Grasshoppers of the Swiss Super League and signed his first professional contract with the Liechtensteiner club FC Vaduz.

He moved MSV Duisburg on 29 August 2019. He left Duisburg at the end of the 2020–21 season. Afterwards, he joined Servette FC.

Career statistics

Honours
2009: 71st Blue Stars/FIFA Youth Cup "best Goalkeeper Award"

References

External links

Profile at U19 auf Sport1.ch, Sport1.ch

1990 births
Living people
People from Wetzikon
Swiss men's footballers
Switzerland under-21 international footballers
Association football goalkeepers
Swiss Super League players
Swiss Challenge League players
FC Winterthur players
Grasshopper Club Zürich players
FC Vaduz players
FC Sion players
FC Aarau players
FC Wil players
MSV Duisburg players
Servette FC players
Swiss expatriate footballers
Expatriate footballers in Germany
Expatriate footballers in Liechtenstein
Swiss expatriate sportspeople in Germany
Swiss expatriate sportspeople in Liechtenstein
Sportspeople from the canton of Zürich